De-Phazz is a downtempo jazz ensemble integrating modern turntablism and elements of soul, Latin, trip hop and drum and bass into a lounge music sound. De-Phazz is led by Pit Baumgartner, a German producer who has varied the lineup of artists for every new album. Some regular members are Barbara Lahr, Karl Frierson and Pat Appleton.

The band has released records on Mole Listening Pearls and Universal Jazz Germany along with single releases on Edel Records and United Recordings, and also remixes existing material.

Releases

 Detunized Gravity (1997)
 Godsdog (1999)
 Death by Chocolate (2001)
 Daily Lama (2002)
 Plastic Love Memory (2002)
 Natural Fake (2005)
 Days of Twang (2007)
 Big (2009)
 Lala 2.0 (2010)
 Audio Elastique (2012)
 Naive (2013)
 The Uppercut Collection (2013)
 Garage Pompeuse (2015)
 Private (2016)
 Prankster Bride (2016)
 Black White Mono (2018)
 Music to Unpack your Christmas Present (2020)
 Jelly Banquet (2022)

References

External links
 

German electronic music groups
German jazz ensembles
Remixers
Trip hop groups